Ursula Hirschmann (2 September 1913 – 8 January 1991) was a German anti-fascist activist and an advocate of European federalism.

Life and career
Hirschmann was born into a middle-class Jewish family to Carl Hirschmann and Hedwig Marcuse in Berlin. She studied economics at Humboldt University of Berlin, together with her brother Albert O. Hirschman, later a candidate for the Nobel Prize. In 1932, she joined the youth organization of the Social Democratic Party to participate in the resistance against the advance of the Nazis.

In the summer of 1933, she and her brother moved to Paris, where they became re-acquainted with Eugenio Colorni, a young Italian philosopher and socialist whom they had already met in Berlin. She continued on to Trieste, the home town of Colorni, where she married him in 1935. They had three daughters: Silvia, Renata, and Eva. In 1973, Eva married Indian economist Amartya Sen. She had been married in 1962 to Italian economist and statesman Giorgio La Malfa. While married to La Malfa, she met Indian economist Mrinal Datta Chaudhuri in mid-1960s  who prompted her to leave her husband and went with Datta Chaudhuri to Delhi. Later she left Datta Chaudhuri and married Sen after their respective divorces came through. 

The couple of Hirschmann and Colorni became engaged in the clandestine anti-fascist opposition. In 1939, Colorni was arrested and sent to confinement on the island of Ventotene. Hirschmann followed her husband there, but as she was not herself held in confinement, she could travel back to the mainland. 

Among the other prisoners and friends of Colorni on Ventotene were Ernesto Rossi and Altiero Spinelli, who in 1941, co-authored the famous Ventotene Manifesto "for a free and united Europe", i. e., an early sketch of a post-war democratic European Union. Hirschmann managed to bring the text of the manifesto to the mainland, and took part in its dissemination. On 27 and 28 August 1943, she participated in the foundation of the European Federalist Movement in Milan.

Having escaped from Ventotene in 1943, Colorni was murdered by fascists in Rome in May 1944. Thereafter, Spinelli became her second husband and adopted her daughters. The couple went to Switzerland, and from there to Rome, where they settled after the war. They had three daughters: Diana, Barbara, and Sara Spinelli.

In 1975, Hirschmann founded the Association Femmes pour l'Europe in Brussels, then in the first days of December of that year, suffered from a cerebral hemorrhage, followed by aphasia, from which she was never to recover completely.

Sources 

Silvana Boccanfuso, Ursula Hirschmann. Una donna per l'Europa, Genova, Ed. Ultima Spiaggia, 2019,

References 

1913 births
1991 deaths
Jewish emigrants from Nazi Germany to France
European integration pioneers
Eurofederalism
Italian resistance movement members
Jewish resistance members during the Holocaust
Humboldt University of Berlin alumni
Burials in the Protestant Cemetery, Rome
Female resistance members of World War II